Karthik Surya is an Indian YouTuber and television anchor from Kerala, India. He is one of the first lifestyle YouTube vlogger from Kerala and is mostly known for his YouTube channel Karthik Surya Vlogs. Karthik is also the host of the television programme Oru Chiri Iru Chiri Bumper Chiri broadcast on Mazhavil Manorama.

Life and career
Karthik Surya hails from Chellamangalam, which is in Thiruvananthapuram. He started the YouTube channel in 2011. However he did his first YouTube vlog in 2017. Later, Karthik quit his job as a business development manager at Technopark to become a full-time vlogger. In 2021, he was selected as the host of the Mazhavil Manorama programme Oru Chiri Iru Chiri Bumper Chiri. Karthik is the first lifestyle YouTube vlogger from Kerala.

Awards

See also
 List of YouTubers
 Firoz Chuttipara

References

Living people
Year of birth missing (living people)
Indian YouTubers